Clube de Futebol de Santa Iria is a Portuguese sports club from , Loures.

The men's football team plays in the Pró-Nacional AF Lisboa. The team played on the third-tier Campeonato de Portugal in 2018–19, but were instantly relegated.

In the Taça de Portugal, Santa Iria notably reached the third round in both 2016–17 and 2018–19.

References

Football clubs in Portugal
Association football clubs established in 1941
1941 establishments in Portugal